The IWA World Junior Heavyweight Championship was a title for wrestlers that weight 225 pounds and under that was being defended in the International Wrestling Association in Puerto Rico. The championship is generally contested in professional wrestling matches, in which participants execute scripted finishes rather than contend in direct competition.

Inaugural Tournament 
Participants of the Inaugural tournament were: Super Crazy, Tajiri, Christopher Daniels, Mr. Águila, Black Scorpion, Danny Boy, Pablo Marquez, Pepe Prado, Reckless Youth, Taka Michinoku, Alexander Otsuka, The Great Sasuke, Tiger Mask IV and Jeff Hardy

Title history

Combined reigns

References

External links 
Wrestling-titles.com
Cagematch.net
Wrestlingdata.com

International Wrestling Association (Puerto Rico) championships
Junior heavyweight wrestling championships